M'Bouna  is a village and commune of the Cercle of Goudam in the Tombouctou Region of Mali. As of 1998, the commune had a population of 6,070.

References

Communes of Tombouctou Region